Morgenstern is the name of a musical project combining noise, industrial, and ambient music. It is a continuing act of Germany's Ant-Zen record label.

History
Morgenstern was founded in 1993 by Andrea Börner. The word "Morgenstern" means "Morning star." Börner was a founding member of the industrial/punk crossover band Ars Moriendi. She now devotes most of her time to Morgenstern, but also participates in the projects Templegarden's, KYAM, and Monokrom.

Discography
(untitled) (Split w/ Mandelbrot), 1994
(untitled) (Split w/ Asche), 1996
That Loop in My Eye (Split w/ Asche), 1997
(s/t), CD, 1998
Zyklen, CD, 1999
Cold, CD, 2001
Erode (with Converter and Asche), CD, 2001
Live at IWTBF Berlin 03 (Split w/ Monokrom), CD-R, 2004
Hypnoider Zustand, CD-R, 2005
Yesterdays, CD-R, 2005
Two Different Faces, CD, 2005

See also 
List of ambient music artists

References

External links
Official website

German industrial music groups
Musical groups established in 1993
Noise musical groups
1993 establishments in Germany